Nephopterix chryserythra is a species of snout moth in the genus Nephopterix. It was described by Oswald Bertram Lower in 1902 and is known from Australia, including Queensland.

References

Moths described in 1902
Phycitini